Loudest Love is an EP by the American rock band Soundgarden. It was released in October 1990 through A&M Records.

Overview
The EP was first released in Japan, and later released in the United States. The track listing is the same as that for the "Loud Love" single, but with the addition of "Hands All Over", "Heretic" and "Come Together". AllMusic staff writer Greg Prato said, "The Loudest Love compilation is quite a find for hardcore fans of Soundgarden, but if you're a newcomer, start off with their 1997 best-of collection, A-Sides, or one of their official albums."

Track listing

Tracks 1–3 are taken directly from the album Louder Than Love and are identical to their album counterparts. Track 7 is a remix of the album version of the song by Steve Fisk, previously available on the "Loud Love" single. Tracks 4 and 6 are b-sides from the "Hands All Over" and  "Loud Love" singles, respectively. Track 5, also previously available on the "Hands All Over" single, is a cover of the classic Beatles tune, and is the only Soundgarden song to feature bassist, and former Nirvana guitarist, Jason Everman.

Personnel
Soundgarden
Matt Cameron – drums
Chris Cornell – lead vocals, rhythm guitar
Jason Everman – bass (track 5)
Kim Thayil – lead guitar
Hiro Yamamoto – bass

Production
Terry Date – production, engineering, and mixing 
Jack Endino – production, engineering & mixing 
Steve Thompson – mixing 
Michael Barbiero – mixing 
Steve Fisk – mixing

Management
Susan Silver Management – management

References

1990 EPs
Soundgarden EPs
A&M Records EPs
Albums produced by Chris Cornell
Albums produced by Matt Cameron
Albums produced by Jack Endino
Albums produced by Terry Date